Krach is a surname. Notable people with the surname include:

Aaron Krach (born 1972), New York writer
Keith Krach, Californian Entrepreneur